Tanto Amor is the third studio album by Shaila Dúrcal. It was released on September 30, 2008.

Track listing
Para Darte Mi Vida
Hasta La Eternidad
Hay Milagros
Juego Perdido
Tanto Amor
Pobre Tonto
Esperaré Un Poco Más 
Crees Que Me Engañas
Tanto Cielo Perdido
Te Quiero Cerca 
Para Darte Mi Vida (Versión En Portugués)

References

2008 albums
Shaila Dúrcal albums
Spanish-language albums